Clock towers in the Philippines are clock towers that can be found in the Philippines. The purposes of these Philippine "towering timepieces" are to tell the time and to serve as landmarks.

Manila City Hall clock tower
The clock tower of the Manila City Hall is an iconic trademark of Manila and of its city hall. The clock tower was unveiled in 1930. Being the largest clock tower in the Philippines, the hexagonal shaped tower has one red-faced clock placed on its three facets. In the evenings, the clock tower of the City Hall of Manila is kept illuminated by light. The bell of the clock tower is rung three times before being followed by a melody. The bells that are located within the tower makes a sound to mark the break time of Manila City Hall employees. The bells ring again at the closing of business day. During the Christmas season in the Philippines, the clock tower is programmed to play Christmas carols that can be heard outside the confines of the building of Manila City Hall. Although monitored regularly for synchronization, there were times that the four clocks of the Manila City Hall clock tower would each show different times.

Baliwag clock tower
The Clock Tower of Baliwag is located in Baliwag, Bulacan. As a self-supporting tower, it stands three stories high.

San Agustin Church clock tower
The clock tower of San Agustin Church in Intramuros, Manila is connected to a church building that has a "low-arched Spanish Renaissance type" architectural design because of the occurrence of earthquakes in the Philippines.

Quiapo Church clock tower

The Quiapo Church, also known as Saint John the Baptist Church and as the Minor Basilica of the Black Nazarene, has its own clock tower.

See also
List of clock towers
List of leaning towers

References

External links

A photograph of a clock tower in Bohol, Philippines